The Nordic Catholic Church is a church body based in Norway of High Church Lutheran patrimony. The Nordic Catholic Church is a member of the Union of Scranton.

The Nordic Catholic Church was founded in 1999 by a group of traditional-minded people belonging to the “orthodox opposition” in the Lutheran state Church of Norway when they left the state church due to, for example, the ordination of women to the priesthood and episcopate. During the process both the Free Synod of the Evangelical Lutheran Church of Sweden and the Anglican Forward in Faith organisation were kept fully informed. In Sweden it was paralleled by the foundation of the Mission Province of the Evangelical Lutheran Church of Sweden. Bishop Roald Nikolai, with respect to the name of the denomination, emphasized that Lutherans have historically referred to themselves as "catholic":

The "Statement of Faith" of the Nordic Catholic Church states that it adheres to its Lutheran heritage to the extent that it has embraced and transmitted the orthodox and catholic faith of the undivided church, therefore also embracing the Old Catholic faith as taught by the Polish National Catholic Church.

The bishop of the Nordic Catholic Church in Scandinavia is Ottar Mikael Myrseth.

Old Catholic Church in Italy (Nordic Catholic Church vicariate)

In 2011, a fraction of the Orthodox Church in Italy was organized as an association in memory of its deceased primate, Antonio De Rosso, under the name Association of Metropolitan Antonio. In 2013, the association was reorganized as the Old Catholic Church in Italy and in 2015 it became a vicariate of the Nordic Catholic Church.

See also 
Evangelical Lutheran Diocese of Norway
Evangelical Lutheran Mission Diocese of Finland
Missionsprovinsen

References

External links
 Official website 
 Scandinavian Lutherans form "Continuing" church
 Out on a Limb in Norway by William J. Tighe (Touchstone July/August, 2002)
 Report from Norway by Fr Roald Flemestad - The National Assembly of Forward in Faith UK on 6 and 7 October 2006
   

Christian denominations established in the 20th century
Christian organizations established in 2000
Lutheranism in Norway
Old Catholic denominations